Exormothecaceae is a family of liverworts in the order Marchantiales.

Genera in the family Exormothecaceae 
The family includes three genera:
 Aitchisoniella Kashyap
 Exormotheca Mitt.
 Stephensoniella Kashyap

References

Marchantiales
Liverwort families